Tawhitia glaucophanes is a moth in the family Crambidae. It was described by Edward Meyrick in 1907. It is endemic to New Zealand, where it has been recorded from Fiordland to Mount Cook.

The wingspan is 21–32 mm. Adults are on wing from late December to February.

References

Crambinae
Moths described in 1907
Moths of New Zealand
Endemic fauna of New Zealand
Taxa named by Edward Meyrick
Endemic moths of New Zealand